Chris Sullivan (born 8 August 1972) is a former Australian rules footballer who played with Melbourne and Richmond in the Australian Football League (AFL).

Sullivan was a rover, recruited from Mazenod Old Collegians as a young red haired teenager. He kicked three goals on debut and at the end of the season was awarded Melbourne's "Best First Year Player" award.

He was traded to Richmond and the end of the 1994 season, in exchange for pick 76 in the 1994 National Draft, used on Todd McHardy.

Sullivan, whose father Tony played 191 games for Melbourne, went to Frankston after his time in the AFL came to an end.

References

1972 births
Living people
Australian rules footballers from Victoria (Australia)
Melbourne Football Club players
Richmond Football Club players
Frankston Football Club players